Puerto Rico Islanders is a Puerto Rican professional soccer team.

This article contains historical and current statistics and records pertaining to the club.

All stats are accurate as of match played February 26, 2009.

Recent seasons

Color:

Statistics in USSF Division 2 Professional League

Seasons in USSF Division 2: 1
First game in USSF Division 2: PRI 3 - NSC Minnesota Stars 1 (April 21, 2010)
Longest consecutive wins in League matches: 2 (April 21, 2010 - April 24, 2010)
Longest unbeaten run in League matches:
Longest unbeaten run at home in league matches:
Longest unbeaten run in away league matches:
Longest winning run in the League (home):
Longest winning run in the League (away):
Most goals scored in a match: PRI 4 - Miami FC 2 (June 2, 2010)
Most goals conceded in a match: Rochester Rhinos 3 - PRI 0 (June 26, 2010)
Largest attendance in a league playoff game:

Statistics in USL First Division

Seasons in USL First Division: 6
First game in USL First Division: Toronto Lynx 1 - PRI 0 (April 17, 2004)
Best position in USL First Division: 1 (2008)
Worst position in USL First Division: 9, Eastern (2004)
Longest consecutive wins in USL First Division:
Longest unbeaten run in League matches: 12 (6 wins, 6 ties) (Aug 3 - Sep 21, 2008)
Longest unbeaten run at home in league matches: 10 (7 wins, 3 ties) (Jun 3 - Sep 16, 2007)
Longest unbeaten run in away league matches: 10 (7 wins, 3 ties) (Jul 6 -  Sep 12)
Longest winning run in the League (home): 5 (July 22 - Sep 16, 2007)
Longest winning run in the League (away):5 (Jul 6 - 27, 2008)
Most goals scored in a season: 46 (2005)
Most goals scored in a match: PRI 4 - Rochester Rhinos 0 (2008-08-08)
Most goals conceded in a match: Portland Timbers 5 - PRI 0 (2004)
Most wins in a league season: 15 (2008)
Most draws in a league season: 10 (2007)
Most defeats in a league season: 17 (2004)
Fewest wins in a league season: 5 (2004)
Fewest draws in a league season: 6 (2004)
Fewest defeats in a league season: 6 (2008)
Largest attendance in a league playoff game: 12,098 (2007)

Statistics in CFU Club Championship
First game in CFUCC: PRI 3 - Hoppers FC 1 (12/9/2006)
Most goals scored in a match: PRI 10 - Sap FC 0 (11/6/2007)
Most goals conceded in a match: PRI 2 - Harbor View FC 2 (11/4/2007)

Statistics in CONCACAF Champions League
First game in the CCL: PRI 1 - LD Alajuelense 1 (8/27/2008)
Longest unbeaten run in the CCL matches: 4 (Aug 27 - Sep 23, 2008)
Most goals scored in a match: PRI 4 - Los Angeles Galaxy 1 (7/28/2010)
Largest attendance in the CCL: 12,993 (8/4/2010)

Historical goals

 1st Goal: Mauricio Salles (April 29, 2004), PRI 1 - 2 Syracuse Salty Dogs

Goalscorer records

All-time goalscorer

Appearance records

All-Time Appearance Leaders

Minutes records

All-Time Minutes Leaders

References 

Statistics
Puerto Rican football club records and statistics